0B (zero B) or 0-B may refer to:

0B, IATA airline designation for Blue Air (Romania)
Type 0B string theory, a variant of Type 0 string theory
 a prefix denoting a binary numeral system
Turret 0B, a point on Hadrian's Wall associated with Milecastle 0
0-based or zero-based systems
Zero-based numbering, numbering in which the initial element of a sequence is assigned the index 0
Zero-based budgeting, a technique of planning and decision-making which reverses the working process of traditional budgeting
Zero-based array, an Array data type in computer science

See also
B0 (disambiguation)